15th meridian may refer to:

15th meridian east, a line of longitude east of the Greenwich Meridian
15th meridian west, a line of longitude west of the Greenwich Meridian